The I FINA World Youth Swimming Championships, more commonly referred to within the swimming community as the 2006 Youth Worlds, were held August 22–27, 2006, in Rio de Janeiro, Brazil. This was the first time the event was held.

The meet took place at the Parque Aquático Júlio de Lamare, a traditional Brazilian pool, which the next year would host the water polo competitions of the 2007 Pan American Games. The meet was contested in a 50 m pool (i.e. "long course meters").

The participants had to be 17 years or younger on the 31 December 2006 (i.e. born 1989 or later).

Medals table

Medal summary

Boy's events

Girl's events

References
Official Results by Omega Timing
 Swim Rankings Results

FINA
S
FINA World Junior Swimming Championships
Swimming
Swimming competitions in Brazil
August 2006 sports events in South America